Alan Patrick Lourenço (born 13 May 1991), or simply Alan Patrick, is a Brazilian footballer who plays for Internacional.

Career

Santos
Patrick played 39 games for Santos professional team and scored seven goals. He helped Santos reach the final of the Copa São Paulo 2010, but the team lost by 3–0 on penalties after a 1–1 tie in regulation time.

Shakhtar Donetsk
On 24 June 2011, Patrick signed a five-year contract with Ukrainian giants Shakhtar Donetsk for 4 million.

Patrick rarely featured for Shakhtar during his first season in Ukraine with his first appearance of the season in a competitive game coming on 12 September 2011 in the Ukrainian Cup against FC Shakhtar Sverdlovsk. He scored the first goal for the team in this match in a 2–0 win. His league debut came on 21 April 2012 as a 73rd-minute substitute for Henrikh Mkhitaryan in a 3–1 victory over Tavriya Simferopol at the Donbass Arena. He made his next appearance the following season in a 4–1 league win over Vorskla Poltava in another substitute appearance, coming on in the 70th minute for Marko Dević who scored the second goal of the match.

Flamengo loan
On 11 June 2015, Alan Patrick joined Flamengo on a loan deal until December of the same year. He finished his first season for Flamengo with 27 appearances and being the club's league top scorer with 7 goals. Although, in October 2016 Alan alongside, Éverton, Marcelo Cirino, Pará and Paulinho got involved in trouble through the media due to excessive partying. The group of players were called "Bonde da Stella", because Stella Artois was the brand of beer they used to drink in those parties. All five players were fined causing embarrassment with the club's directors, but only Paulinho left the club for the following season on loan to Santos. Despite this problem his loan deal was eventually extended for another year.

Return to Shakhtar
He return to Shakhtar in January 2017. Patrick became an important member of the Shakhtar side during the 2017–18 season and helped the club to their second successive league and cup double. On 8 May 2018, he signed a contract extension until June 2022.

On 11 August 2020, Patrick scored from the penalty spot as Shakhtar defeated FC Basel by a score of 4–1 to reach the semi-finals of the Europa League.

On 21 August 2020, Patrick score two goals in Shakhtar's first league game of the 2020–21 season, a 3–1 win over Kolos Kovalivka.

Internacional
On 12 April 2022, Internacional announced the signing of Patrick on a contract until April 2025, with Shakhtar confirming the move the following day.

Career statistics

Honours

Club
Santos
Campeonato Paulista: 2010, 2011
Copa do Brasil: 2010
Copa Libertadores: 2011

Shakhtar Donetsk
Ukrainian Premier League: 2011–12, 2012–13, 2016–17, 2017–18, 2018–19, 2019–20
Ukrainian Cup: 2011–12, 2012–13, 2016–17, 2017–18, 2018–19
Ukrainian Super Cup: 2017, 2021

Internacional
Campeonato Gaúcho: 2014

International
South American Youth Championship: 2011
FIFA U-20 World Cup: 2011

References

External links
Santos FC

 

1991 births
Living people
People from Catanduva
Brazilian footballers
Brazil under-20 international footballers
Brazil youth international footballers
Brazilian expatriate footballers
Santos FC players
FC Shakhtar Donetsk players
Sport Club Internacional players
Sociedade Esportiva Palmeiras players
CR Flamengo footballers
Campeonato Brasileiro Série A players
Ukrainian Premier League players
Expatriate footballers in Ukraine
Brazilian expatriate sportspeople in Ukraine
Association football midfielders
Footballers from São Paulo (state)